Michèle Angirany (April 9, 1925 – 5 March 2021) was a French cross-country skier during the 1950s. She finished 18th in the 10 km event at the 1952 Winter Olympics in Oslo.

Cross-country skiing results

Olympic Games

References

External links
Michèle Angirany's profile at Sports Reference.com

1925 births
2021 deaths
French female cross-country skiers
Olympic cross-country skiers of France
Cross-country skiers at the 1952 Winter Olympics
Sportspeople from Lyon
20th-century French women